The Majko II Government was the 61st ruling government of the Republic of Albania, led by prime minister Pandeli Majko. It was officially mandated by president Rexhep Meidani on 22 February 2002. After the 2001 parliamentary elections, the alliance led by the Socialist Party won a seat majority for the second consecutive time and managed to form a government headed by Ilir Meta but due to internal conflicts within the party, Meta was forced to offer his resignation on 29 January 2002. Majko managed to persuade most of the party hierarchy, including its chairman Fatos Nano, to form a new government, although as it turned out, for the same reasons as the Meta II Government, he offered his resignation a few months later on 25 July 2002.

Overview 
A few months after the formation of the Meta II Government, in the Socialist Party (PS), debates broke out between the incumbent Prime Minister and the party chairman, Mr. Fatos Nano. The conflict escalated in early December 2001 when the party chairman convened for three consecutive days the General Steering Committee of the Socialist Party or as it was otherwise known by the acronym KPD. In this committee, he accuses some ministers of the Meta government of being corrupt, incompetent, and not reflecting the will of the voters of PS. This led to the resignation of 4 ministers in those days, whom Meta replaced by taking the decree of the President a few days later, but Nano refused to give his consensus resulting in a non-vote on the parliament. President Meidani did not hesitate to take the case to the Constitutional Court and threatened to dissolve parliament.

However, in order to pave the way for a solution, Ilir Meta himself offered his resignation as Prime Minister on 29 January 2002. Nano, on the other hand, could not offer himself as a new candidate for Prime Minister because according to the statute of the Socialist Party, the role of PM and the party chairman could not be exercised simultaneously. Fearing the same situation as in Meta government and willing to consolidate his power in the party, he chose the latter instead of governing the country.

Majko, on the other hand, volunteered to govern the country for a second time, and given that he was a figure that found consensus from both factions in the party, he began working to form a new government trying to persuade both sides. This in fact suited Nano's situation, as it gave him time to start a process within the party to change the statute and allow him to exercise simultaneously the chairman and prime minister.

Cabinet

See also 
 Politics of Albania
 Council of Ministers of Albania

Sources

References

G61
2001 establishments in Albania
Ministries established in 2002
Cabinets established in 2002